Bəşirbəyli (also, Beshirbeyli) is a village in the Salyan District of Azerbaijan. The village forms part of the municipality of Pambıqkənd.

References 

Populated places in Salyan District (Azerbaijan)